Valinda is a census-designated place (CDP) in the San Gabriel Valley, in Los Angeles County, California, in the United States. At the 2010 census, the population was 22,822, up from 21,776 at the 2000 census.

Geography
Valinda is located at  (34.037760, -117.928939).

Demographics

2010
At the 2010 census Valinda had a population of 22,822. The racial makeup of Valinda was 11,058 (48.5%) White (7.0% Non-Hispanic White), 439 (1.9%) African American, 240 (1.1%) Native American, 2,718 (11.9%) Asian, 42 (0.2%) Pacific Islander, 7,530 (33.0%) from other races, and 795 (3.5%) from two or more races. Hispanic or Latino of any race were 17,977 persons (78.8%).

The census reported that 22,733 people (99.6% of the population) lived in households, 83 (0.4%) lived in non-institutionalized group quarters, and 6 (0%) were institutionalized.

There were 4,927 households, 2,852 (57.9%) had children under the age of 18 living in them, 3,100 (62.9%) were opposite-sex married couples living together, 814 (16.5%) had a female householder with no husband present, 479 (9.7%) had a male householder with no wife present.  There were 243 (4.9%) unmarried opposite-sex partnerships, and 31 (0.6%) same-sex married couples or partnerships. 375 households (7.6%) were one person and 183 (3.7%) had someone living alone who was 65 or older. The average household size was 4.61.  There were 4,393 families (89.2% of households); the average family size was 4.63.

The age distribution was 6,672 people (29.2%) under the age of 18, 2,651 people (11.6%) aged 18 to 24, 6,320 people (27.7%) aged 25 to 44, 5,191 people (22.7%) aged 45 to 64, and 1,988 people (8.7%) who were 65 or older.  The median age was 31.7 years. For every 100 females, there were 100.5 males.  For every 100 females age 18 and over, there were 98.1 males.

There were 5,071 housing units at an average density of 2,517.7 per square mile, of the occupied units 3,755 (76.2%) were owner-occupied and 1,172 (23.8%) were rented. The homeowner vacancy rate was 0.9%; the rental vacancy rate was 3.3%.  17,054 people (74.7% of the population) lived in owner-occupied housing units and 5,679 people (24.9%) lived in rental housing units.

According to the 2010 United States Census, Valinda had a median household income of $66,727, with 11.1% of the population living below the federal poverty line.

2000
At the 2000 census there were 21,776 people, 4,753 households, and 4,258 families in the CDP. The population density was 10,830.8 inhabitants per square mile (4,183.0/km). The racial makeup of the CDP was 40.47% White, 2.46% African American, 1.18% Native American, 9.42% Asian, 0.19% Pacific Islander, 41.08% from other races, and 5.19% from two or more races. Hispanic or Latino of any race were 74.72%.

Of the 4,753 households 52.2% had children under the age of 18 living with them, 66.3% were married couples living together, 15.7% had a female householder with no husband present, and 10.4% were non-families. 7.1% of households were one person and 3.3% were one person aged 65 or older.  The average household size was 4.57 and the average family size was 4.64.

The age distribution was 34.3% under the age of 18, 10.9% from 18 to 24, 30.0% from 25 to 44, 17.8% from 45 to 64, and 7.0% 65 or older.  The median age was 28 years. For every 100 females, there were 98.6 males.  For every 100 females age 18 and over, there were 96.1 males.

The median household income was $49,578 and the median family income  was $49,653. Males had a median income of $28,388 versus $25,330 for females. The per capita income for the CDP was $12,949.  About 10.5% of families and 12.8% of the population were below the poverty line, including 16.0% of those under age 18 and 10.0% of those age 65 or over.

Government and infrastructure
In the state legislature Valinda is located in the 24th Senate District, represented by Democrat Gloria Romero, and in the 57th Assembly District, represented by Democrat Edward P. Hernandez. Federally, Valinda is located in California's California's 32nd congressional district, which is represented by Democrat Grace Napolitano.

The Los Angeles County Sheriff's Department operates the Industry Station in the City of Industry, serving Valinda.

The Los Angeles County Department of Health Services operates the Pomona Health Center in Pomona, serving Valinda.

Education
The majority of Valinda students are served by the Hacienda La Puente Unified School District while a portion of Northern Valinda is served by the West Covina Unified School District.

References

External links
Regional Chamber of Commerce - San Gabriel Valley

Communities in the San Gabriel Valley
Census-designated places in Los Angeles County, California
Census-designated places in California